This article lists the complete results of the knockout stage of the 2008 Uber Cup in Jakarta, Indonesia.

Bracket

Play-offs

New Zealand vs. Netherlands

Malaysia vs. Japan

Germany vs. South Africa

Hong Kong vs. United States

Quarter finals

Denmark vs. Germany

Indonesia vs. Hong Kong

China vs. Netherlands

Korea vs. Malaysia

Semi finals

China vs. Korea

Germany vs. Indonesia

Final

China vs. Indonesia

References

Uber Cup Knockout Stage, 2008